The women's 200 metre individual medley at the 2015 IPC Swimming World Championships was held at the Tollcross International Swimming Centre in Glasgow, United Kingdom from 13–17 July.

Medalists

Legend
WR: World record, CR: Championship record, AF: Africa record, AM: Americas record, AS: Asian record, EU: European record, OS: Oceania record

See also
List of IPC world records in swimming

References

individual medley 200 m women
2015 in women's swimming